Nadarajah Asokan is a professor of computer science and the David R. Cheriton Chair in Software Systems at the University of Waterloo’s David R. Cheriton School of Computer Science. He is also an adjunct professor in the Department of Computer Science at Aalto University.

Education and career 
Asokan received a bachelor of technology (BTech) honours in computer science and engineering from the Indian Institute of Technology Kharagpur in 1988, a master of science (MS) in computer and information science from Syracuse University in 1989, and a PhD in computer science from the University of Waterloo in 1998. His doctoral thesis was on the topic of Fairness in Electronic Commerce.

From 1999 to 2012 he was employed at Nokia Research Center (NRC) in Helsinki, Finland, where he worked on several notable projects, including contributions to the design of the numeric comparison protocol as part of the Bluetooth Secure Simple Pairing update, as well as what would become the Generic Bootstrapping Architecture.

From September 2012 until December 2017 he was a professor of computer science at the University of Helsinki (part-time from August 2013 onwards). In 2013 he became a tenured (full) professor of computer science at Aalto University, where he co-led the Secure Systems Group (SSG) and established the Helsinki-Aalto Center for Information Security (HAIC), since renamed to the Helsinki-Aalto Institute for Cybersecurity.

At Aalto University he led research projects funded by the Academy of Finland, Business Finland, and various companies. He was a principal investigator (PI) of the Intel Research Institute for Collaborative Resilient and Autonomous Systems (CARS).

In 2019 he joined the David R. Cheriton School of Computer Science at the University of Waterloo as a (full) professor and a David R. Cheriton Chair in Software Systems.

Asokan is the inventor of over 50 granted patents.

Awards and recognition 
 Fellow of the Association for Computing Machinery for contributions to systems security and privacy, especially of mobile systems (2018)
 Association for Computing Machinery Special Interest Group on Security, Audit and Control (SIGSAC) Outstanding Innovation Award for pioneering research on fair-exchange protocols, trusted device pairing and mobile trusted execution environments that has had widespread impact and led to large-scale deployment (2018)
 Fellow of the Institute of Electrical and Electronics Engineers for contributions to system security and privacy (2017)
 Association for Computing Machinery (ACM) Distinguished Scientist (2015)
 Google Faculty Research Award in the field of security (2013)

Other contributions 
Asokan was part of the team that translated the book Operaatio Elop (Operation Elop) from Finnish into English.

References

External links 
 
 N. Asokan at DBLP Computer Science Bibliography
 N. Asokan at ACM Digital Library
 

Fellows of the Association for Computing Machinery
Computer security academics
Nokia people
Living people
University of Waterloo alumni
Fellow Members of the IEEE
Academic staff of the University of Helsinki
Academic staff of the University of Waterloo
Academic staff of Aalto University
Year of birth missing (living people)